Orrville is a town in Dallas County, Alabama, United States. At the 2020 census, the population was 150. According to the 1910 U.S. census, Orrville incorporated in 1908, though it was listed as an incorporated community prior to that.

Geography
Orrville is located in western Dallas County at  (32.305584, -87.245378). Alabama State Route 22 passes through the town, leading northeast  to Selma, the county seat, and west  to Safford.

Demographics

As of the census of 2000, there were 230 people, 105 households, and 59 families residing in the town. The racial makeup of the town was 51.30% White, 48.26% Black or African American, and 0.43% from two or more races. 0.43% of the population were Hispanic or Latino of any race.

There were 105 households, out of which 20.0% had children under the age of 18 living with them, 42.9% were married couples living together, 10.5% had a female householder with no husband present, and 42.9% were non-families. 41.9% of all households were made up of individuals, and 19.0% had someone living alone who was 65 years of age or older. The average household size was 2.19 and the average family size was 3.03.

In the town, the population was spread out, with 19.6% under the age of 18, 7.0% from 18 to 24, 26.1% from 25 to 44, 26.1% from 45 to 64, and 21.3% who were 65 years of age or older. The median age was 43 years. For every 100 females, there were 88.5 males. For every 100 females age 18 and over, there were 85.0 males.

The median income for a household in the town was $28,571, and the median income for a family was $31,719. Males had a median income of $29,583 versus $30,000 for females. The per capita income for the town was $15,418. About 9.9% of families and 15.7% of the population were below the poverty line, including none of those under the age of eighteen and 22.2% of those sixty-five or over.

Government
Orrville is an incorporated town, governed by a mayor/town council structure.  Current Mayor Louvenia Lumpkin was first elected in 2012, defeating incumbent Mayor Gene McHugh; she was re-elected in 2016.   Herman Majors is Orrville's Town Council President and its longest-serving town councilmember, first appointed in 1970 and re-elected every term since then.  Other councilmembers elected or re-elected in 2016 include Jewell Williamson, William Lumpkin (husband of Mayor Louvenia Lumpkin), Jerry Phillips and Jim Brunson.

Businesses
At the height of the expansion of the recreational boating industry, Orrville was home to Baker-Jewell Inc., a small manufacturing company which produced small fiberglass boats for the recreational market. They featured iconic styling of the late 1950s era, including automotive-type tailfins and seating.

Today a small factory in Orrville manufactures portable buildings.

Orrville Farmers Market opened in 2016 in the heart of town and sells locally grown farm-fresh produce, artisan foods, agricultural-based products and country-themed gifts.  The market also serves hot breakfast and lunch six days a week, Monday through Saturday. Orrville Farmers Market gives local farmers the opportunity to develop a personal relationship with their customers and to cultivate consumer loyalty to the farmer who grows the produce and produces farm-fresh products.

Notable person
 Jimmy "Orion" Ellis, singer

Gallery
Below are photographs taken of structures in Orrville as part of the Historic American Buildings Survey:

References 

Towns in Alabama
Towns in Dallas County, Alabama